P. brassicae may refer to:

 Phyllosticta brassicae, a fungal pathogen
 Phytometra brassicae, a moth that is very destructive to plants
 Phytophthora brassicae, a water mould
 Pieris brassicae, a pest butterfly
 Plasmodiophora brassicae, a plant pathogen
 Pyrenopeziza brassicae, a plant pathogen